Eric Sidney Fostyn Holland (28 June 1921 – 1 July 1989) was a New Zealand politician who served as an elected member of the House of Representatives from 1967 to 1981 for the National Party and as a Cabinet Minister in the second and third National governments.

Biography

Early life and career
Holland was born in 1921; he was the son of former prime minister and National Party leader Sir Sidney Holland. He received his education at Elmwood School and St. Andrew's College in Christchurch. Holland fought in WW2 in the Pacific and in Italy. He was president of the Canterbury Savings Bank in 1965 and 1966, and president of the Associated Trustee Savings Banks of New Zealand in 1966 and 1967.

In 1944, Holland married Janet Mary Wills, the daughter of Wilfrid John Wills. They had one son and two daughters, and divorced in 1970. In 1972, he married Nancy Mary Nilner.

Political career

Holland was involved in the National Party and became chairman of the Fendalton Electorate Committee and deputy-chairman National's Canterbury-Westland division.

The death of Harry Lake in early 1967 caused the 15 April 1967 by-election in the Fendalton electorate. Holland entered contention and won the National Party nomination. He defeated Labour's Bruce Barclay in the election. The polling night results in the Fendalton by-election showed a 67-vote majority to Barclay, however after special votes were counted National did manage to hold the seat by just 286 votes, a swing of over 5% to Labour. This was a surprise result in a safe National seat. He represented this electorate for three parliamentary terms until 1978, when Riccarton was in turn abolished.

At the end of the Second National Government Prime Minister Jack Marshall appointed Holland as Minister of Housing from 9 February to 8 December 1972 when the government was defeated. During National's unsuccessful  election campaign Labour's housing policy of enabling home loans through the State Advances Corporation for people carrying out renovations on state houses to bring them up to standards received an unusually large amount of interest. Two days later it prompted Holland to announce the government would introduce an identical policy to Labour's.

After National's defeat Marshall retained him in the same portfolio as Shadow Minister of Housing from 1973 to 1974. When Robert Muldoon replaced Marshall as party leader he instead designated Shadow Minister of Energy and Electricity from 1974 to 1975.

During the Third National Government under Muldoon, Holland was appointed Minister of Energy Resources, Minister of Electricity, and Minister of Mines (all 12 December 1975 – 8 March 1977), and then once again as Minister of Housing (8 March 1977 – 13 December 1978). His portfolio shift back to Housing was precipitated by him suffering a stroke.

Later life and death
Holland died on 1 July 1989.

Notes

References

|-

|-

|-

1921 births
1989 deaths
New Zealand National Party MPs
Members of the Cabinet of New Zealand
Ministers of Housing (New Zealand)
People from Christchurch
New Zealand MPs for Christchurch electorates
Members of the New Zealand House of Representatives
20th-century New Zealand politicians
Children of prime ministers of New Zealand
New Zealand military personnel of World War II